Cody Lang (born August 23, 1993) is an American soccer player.

Career

College
Lang played four years of college soccer at Seattle Pacific University between 2013 and 2016. He also appeared for NPSL sides Spokane Shadow and Detroit City FC.

Professional
On September 14, 2017, Lang signed with United Soccer League side Seattle Sounders FC 2.

References

External links

1993 births
Living people
American soccer players
Seattle Pacific Falcons men's soccer players
Tacoma Defiance players
Association football goalkeepers
Soccer players from Washington (state)
USL Championship players